Uruthirajenma Kannar (Tamil: உருத்திர சன்மகண்ணர்) was a poet of the Sangam period to whom verse 31 of the Tiruvalluva Maalai.

Biography
Uruthirajenma Kannar was a poet belonging to the late Sangam period that corresponds between 1st century BCE and 2nd century CE. He is known to be short-tempered, with his eyes seething in rage most of the times. Hence he was known by the name "Uruthirajenma Kannar", which literally means "he who has eyes raging with anger".

View on Valluvar and the Kural
Uruthirajenma Kannar has authored verse 31 of the Tiruvalluva Maalai. He opines about Valluvar and the Kural text thus:

See also

 Sangam literature
 List of Sangam poets
 Tiruvalluva Maalai

Citations

References

 
 

Tamil philosophy
Tamil poets
Sangam poets
Tiruvalluva Maalai contributors